The Bibliotheca Polyglotta is a Norwegian database for Multilingualism project, lingua franca and science per global history at the University of Oslo. The aim of the project is according to pages is "producing a web corpus of Buddhist texts for using in multilingual lexicography. More generally, will the texts used for the study Sanskrit, Chinese and Tibetan."

References 
 Om databasen på UiOs nettsider
 Bibliotheca Polyglotta

University of Oslo
Lexical databases
Corpus linguistics
Buddhist studies